Gornja Lokvica is a settlement northwest of Metlika in the White Carniola area of southeastern Slovenia. The entire area is part of the traditional region of Lower Carniola and is now included in the Southeast Slovenia Statistical Region.

Mass grave
Gornja Lokvica is the site of a mass grave associated with the Second World War. The Jastrebenca Cave Mass Grave is located west of the village and contains the remains of undetermined victims.

Church
The local church is dedicated to John the Baptist and belongs to the Parish of Metlika. It was badly damaged during the Second World War and only the belfry and the sanctuary of the original building survive and are incorporated into the modern building.

References

External links
Gornja Lokvica on Geopedia

Populated places in the Municipality of Metlika